The  Akwa Ibom State Association of Nigeria, USA Inc. (AKISAN) National Convention  is the highest legislative activity of AKISAN and is generally held in August of every year. Divided into Business and General Sessions, the Convention is a gathering of all the chapters of the Association for legislative, cultural and social reasons. Until the 1990 gathering at Atlanta, Georgia, the convention was known as the Colloquium.

Past conventions

Notable attendees and speeches 
In 1977 the Colloquium was addressed by the Cross River State Military Governor Major General Paul Ufuoma Omu, through the presentation of B.E. Bassey, the Cross River State Commissioner for Education. The elected civilian Executive Governor of Akwa Ibom State, Obong Victor Attah and his wife Allison, attended the 1999 Convention in Houston, Texas. In 2007 the Executive Governor, Godswill Akpabio, sent a goodwill message to the convention. The 2007 convention was attended by two ex-Governors of the state, Victor Attah and Idongesit Nkanga.

Free education policy announcement 
.|Governor Akpabio delivers a key policy speech on education during the 2008 AKISAN National Convention]]
During the last year of Monday R. Affiah's administration in 2008, Governor Godswill Akpabio led a 50-member delegation from Nigeria to the convention hosted by the Washington, DC Chapter in Alexandria, VA. The governor announced donation of 100,000 U.S. dollars to the Association and delivered a policy speech announcing free universal education to all citizens of the state from primary to senior secondary school level.

The Governor announced the creation of the Diaspora Desk to coordinate the flow of information between the State Government and the Association. Former United States Ambassador to Nigeria Howard F Jetter announced the donation of thousands of books to Akwa Ibom State.

Notable delegates 
Some members of the delegation to attend the AKISAN National Convention in 2008 included Helen Esuene, former Federal Minister and wife of the late first military governor of South-Eastern State Brigadier Udokaha Esuene, Idongesit Nkanga first military/indigenous governor of Akwa Ibom State, Umana O. Umana Secretary to the government of Akwa Ibom State, Senator Aloysius Etuk, Otuekong Sunny Jackson Udoh, Chairman of the Niger Delta Development Commission Bassey Dan Abia, Executive Director of Mobil Producing Nigeria Unlimited Udom Inoyo, the first Akwa Ibom State female Head of Service Elder Grace Anwana, the Convention Chairman Obong Stephen Udofia and his wife Mrs. Idongesit Asuquo Udofia, and then Speaker of the State House of Assembly Rt. Hon Samuel Ikon.

Other attendees from Nigeria included Nollywood stars of Akwa Ibom State extraction led by actress, songwriter and television personality Ms. Anne Inyang with 8 albums to her credit and whose international hit song "Akanam Nkwe" was performed live to a standing ovation at the Convention.

Some Members of the Delegation to AKISAN 2019 Convention in Houston, Texas included Special Guest of Honor- Dr. Emmanuel Ekuwem, Secretary to the State Governor of Akwa Ibom State, represented His Excellency, Mr. Udom Emmanuel, Otuekong Idongesit Nkanga, former Military Governor of Akwa Ibom State of Nigeria, Rt. Hon. Aniekan Bassey, Speaker Akwa Ibom House of Assembly, Mr. Udom Inoyo, Vice Chairman ExxonMobil and 2019 Convention Chairman, Senator Dr. (Mrs.) Akon Eyakenyi, Congresswoman Mrs. Sheila Jackson of the United States of America Congress, Hon. Onofiok Luke- Hon. Member Federal House Representative (Convention Keynote Speaker), Rt. Hon. Michael Enyong- Hon. Member Federal House of Representative  Rt. Hon. Felicia Bassey Deputy Speaker AKSHA, HRM Raymond Inyang Paramount Ruler of ONNA (and wife), Chief Paul Ekpo, Mr. Friday Ben Assistant Chief Protocols Officer to the State Governor, Mr. Nkanang Gabriel Nkanang, Mr. Gabriel Ukpeh- Chairman FDI and  Entertainer Aity Inyang

2010 National Convention 
The 2010 AKISAN National Convention was held at the Radisson Plaza Lord Baltimore, Baltimore, MD between August 5-8th.

References 

Conventions (meetings)